Stygobromus hadenoecus, commonly called Devil's Sinkhole amphipod, is a troglomorphic species of amphipod in family Crangonyctidae. It is endemic to Texas in the United States.

See also
 Devil's Sinkhole State Natural Area - the National Natural Landmark where it lives in three lakes inside the big cave.

References

Freshwater crustaceans of North America
Crustaceans described in 1966
Cave crustaceans
hadenoecus
Endemic fauna of Texas